The 2002 Grand American Road Racing Championship was the third season of the Rolex Sports Car Series run by the Grand American Road Racing Association.  The season involved five classes: Sports Racing Prototype I and II (SRP-I and SRP-II), Grand Touring Sport (GTS), Grand Touring (GT), and American GT (AGT).  10 races were run from February 2, 2002 to November 10, 2002. Mont-Tremblant replaced Trois-Rivières. California Speedway replaced Lime Rock. Virginia International replaced Road America. The season also was marred by the death of Jeff Clinton during the Nextel 250 race weekend.

Schedule

Results 
Overall winners in bold.

References

External links
 The official website of Grand-Am
 Grand American Road Racing Association - 2002 season archive
 World Sports Racing Prototypes - Rolex Sports Car Series 2002 results

Rolex Sports Car Series
Rolex Sports Car Series
Rolex Sports Car Series